Thomas Lynn James (born 15 April 1996) is a Welsh professional footballer who plays as a defender for English League Two club Leyton Orient. James has previously played for Cardiff City, Yeovil Town, Hibernian, Wigan Athletic and Salford City.

Early life
James grew up in Taff's Well, attending Gwaelod-y-Garth Primary School and Ysgol Gyfun Garth Olwg, Pontypridd. He was playing for Pentyrch Rangers when talent-spotted by Cardiff City.

Club career
James joined Cardiff City at under-9 level and signed his first professional contract with the club in April 2014. James made his professional debut for Cardiff against Chelsea on 11 May 2014, coming on as an 89th minute substitute for Fraizer Campbell in a 2–1 home loss.

On 13 January 2017, James signed for League Two side Yeovil Town on a contract until the end of the 2016–17 season, after his contract with Cardiff was cancelled by mutual consent. In January 2018 James signed a contract extension with Yeovil Town until the end of the 2018–19 season. On 1 August 2018, Yeovil accepted a bid of £400,000 from Championship side West Bromwich Albion for James. The move fell through the following day after James failed to agree personal terms with the Championship club.

James moved to Scottish Premiership club Hibernian in June 2019 for an undisclosed fee, signing a three-year contract. He scored his first goal for Hibernian in a 2-0 Scottish League Cup win over Alloa Athletic on 20 July 2019. On 17 September 2020, James moved on loan to Wigan Athletic until January 2021. He scored his first goal for Wigan in a 2-1 win away at Portsmouth on 26 September 2020. On 18 January 2021, James moved on loan to Salford City until the end of the 2020–21 season. He was cup-tied for Salford's victory in the 2020 EFL Trophy Final (played in March 2021).

James left Hibernian permanently in July 2021 and signed a one-year contract with Leyton Orient. In May 2022 he signed for a further two years at Orient.

International career
At the end of May 2014, James was called up to the Wales under-19 team for their 2014 UEFA European Under-19 Championship elite round matches against Belgium, Portugal and Greece James made his under-19 debut in a 3–2 defeat to Portugal.

Career statistics

References

External links
 

1996 births
Living people
People from Taff's Well
Sportspeople from Rhondda Cynon Taf
Welsh footballers
Wales youth international footballers
Association football defenders
Cardiff City F.C. players
Yeovil Town F.C. players
Hibernian F.C. players
Wigan Athletic F.C. players
Salford City F.C. players
Premier League players
English Football League players
Scottish Professional Football League players
Leyton Orient F.C. players